Joseph LaLeggia (born June 24, 1992) is a Canadian professional ice hockey defenceman who is currently playing for HV71 in the Swedish Hockey League (SHL). LaLeggia was drafted 123rd overall in the 2012 NHL Entry Draft by the Edmonton Oilers.

Playing career
LaLeggia played collegiate hockey for the Denver Pioneers in NCAA's Division I in the National Collegiate Hockey Conference (NCHC) conference. LaLeggia came to the Denver Pioneers after playing junior hockey in the British Columbia Hockey League with the Penticton Vees.

On March 31, 2015, upon completing his senior year LaLeggia signed his first professional contract in agreeing to a two-year entry-level deal with the Edmonton Oilers.

During his first season with the Oilers organization, LaLeggia recorded 27 points in 63 games with the Bakersfield Condors of the American Hockey League. He improved his scoring totals the following season, recording 38 points. On July 12, 2017, the Oilers re-signed LaLeggia to a one-year, two-way contract worth $700,000 at the NHL level.

On July 1, 2018, having left the Oilers in the off-season as a free agent, LaLeggia agreed to a two-year, two-way contract with the St. Louis Blues.

Following the conclusion of his contract with the Blues, having played exclusively with affiliate, the San Antonio Rampage, LaLeggia opted to pursue an European career, by signing a one-year contract for the remainder of the 2020-21 season with Swedish club, Rögle BK of the SHL, on January 17, 2021. 

In helping Rögle BK reach the SHL finals, LaLeggia opted to remain in the SHL by signing an initial one-year contract with fellow SHL outfit, Timrå IK, on June 9, 2021. 

During his second season with Timrå IK in the 2022–23 campaign, LaLeggia registered 2 goals and 5 points through 9 games before transferring to newly promoted HV71 on October 19, 2022.

Career statistics

Awards and honours

References

External links

1992 births
Living people
AHCA Division I men's ice hockey All-Americans
Bakersfield Condors players
Canadian ice hockey defencemen
Canadian ice hockey left wingers
Denver Pioneers men's ice hockey players
Edmonton Oilers draft picks
HV71 players
Ice hockey people from British Columbia
Oklahoma City Barons players
Penticton Vees players
Rögle BK players
San Antonio Rampage players
Sportspeople from Burnaby
Timrå IK players